John Williamson  Lenhart (December 4, 1915 – September 24, 1991) was an American professional basketball player. He played for the Buffalo Bisons in the National Basketball League for three games during their 1937–38 season.

References

1915 births
1991 deaths
American men's basketball players
American military personnel of World War II
Buffalo Bisons (NBL) players
Colgate Raiders men's basketball players
Forwards (basketball)
Basketball players from New York City